The Bishop of Clogher is an episcopal title which takes its name after the village of Clogher in County Tyrone, Northern Ireland. Following the Reformation, there are now parallel apostolic successions: one of the Church of Ireland and the other of the Roman Catholic Church.

History
Clogher is one of the twenty-four dioceses established at the Synod of Ráth Breasail in 1111 and consists of much of south west Ulster, taking in most of counties Fermanagh and Monaghan and parts of Tyrone, Cavan, Leitrim and Donegal. Frequently in the Irish annals the Bishop of Clogher was styled the Bishop of Oirialla. Between c. 1140 to c. 1190, County Louth was transferred from the see of Armagh to the see of Clogher. During this period the Bishop of Clogher used the style Bishop of Louth. The title Bishop of Clogher was resumed after 1193, when County Louth was restored to the see of Armagh.

Present Ordinaries
In the Church of Ireland
The present Church of Ireland bishop is the Right Reverend Dr. Ian W. Ellis, elected in September 2020 and consecrated in April 2021  The Church of Ireland bishop is unique in having two diocesan cathedrals within a single diocese, with one Dean and chapter between them: the Cathedral Church of Saint Macartin, Enniskillen and the Cathedral Church of Saint Macartan, Clogher.

In the Roman Catholic Church
The current Roman Catholic bishop is the Most Reverend Lawrence Duffy who was appointed by the Holy See on 8 December 2018 and ordained bishop on 10 February 2019. The Roman Catholic bishop's seat (cathedra) is located at the Cathedral Church of Saint Macartan, Monaghan.

Pre-Reformation bishops

Post-Reformation bishops

Church of Ireland succession

Roman Catholic succession

See also

 Diocese of Clogher (Church of Ireland)
 Roman Catholic Diocese of Clogher

Citations

References

 
 
 

Bishops of Clogher
Bishops of Clogher
Clogher
Clogher
Roman Catholic Diocese of Clogher